Macherla Niyojakavargam is a 2022 Indian Telugu-language action film written and directed by editor M. S. Rajashekhar Reddy, in his directorial debut. It was produced by Nithiin's family, under Sreshth Movies. The film stars Nithin, Krithi Shetty and Catherine Tresa. It was released in theatres on 12 August 2022 and received mostly negative reviews from critics.

Premise 
Siddhartha Reddy, an IAS officer, gets a posting as the district collector for Guntur district in Andhra Pradesh to conduct elections peacefully, but faces opposition from Rajappa, a corrupt politician and a cat-and-mouse game ensues between them.

Cast 
 Nithin as N. Siddharth 'Siddhu' Reddy IAS
 Krithi Shetty as Swathi
 Catherine Tresa as Nidhi
 Samuthirakani as MLA Rajappa and Veera (dual role)
 Rajendra Prasad as Surendra, Swathi’s father
 Vennela Kishore as Guru, Swathi’s brother-in-law
 Murali Sharma as Narendra Reddy, Siddhu’s father
 Jayaprakash as Chief Minister of Andhra Pradesh
 Indraja as Siddhu’s mother
 Subhalekha Sudhakar as Raghavaiah, Swathi’s grandfather
 Brahmaji as Narayana, MRO of Macherla
 Duvvasi Mohan as Chief Minister’s assistant
 Rajitha as Swathi’s mother
 Shyamala as Guru’s wife
 Vadlamani Srinivas as Vizag Police Constable
 Sirisha Sougandh as Nidhi’s mother
 Anjali- cameo appearance in the song "Ra Ra Reddy I'm Ready"

Production 
On 10 September 2021, Sreshth Movies made an announcement, on the occasion of Vinayak Chaturthi, with a puja ceremony of their upcoming movie with Nithiin. It is produced under the banner of Sreshth Movies in association with Aditya Movies & Entertainments. Principal photography commenced in September 2021.

Music

The music is composed by Mahathi Swara Sagar, his third collaboration with Nithiin, after Bheeshma and Maestro. The audio is distributed by Aditya Music.

The first single titled "Chill Maro" was sung by Nakash Aziz, Sanjana Kalmanje and it was released on 31 May 2022. The second single titled "Ra Ra Reddy I'm Ready" was released on 9 July 2022. A part of the song "Ranu Ranu Antundi Chinnadho" from Nithiin's first film Jayam too was recreated within the song.

Release 
The film was released in theatres on 12 August 2022. The post-theatrical streaming rights of the film were acquired by ZEE5 and premiered on 9 December 2022. 

The Hindi dubbed version titled MCK: Macherla Chunav Kshetra was directly premiered on Sony Max on 11 December 2022.

Reception 
Macherla Niyojakavargam received negative reviews from critics. Arvind V of Pinkvilla rated the film 2 out of 5 stars and wrote "The story of Macherla Niyojakavargam checks all the wrong boxes, boxes that have been reintroduced from a bygone era: Threatening a widow". 123Telugu wrote that the film is "routine and outdated action drama with a select few mass moments". Neeshitha Nyayapati of The Times of India rated the film 1.5 out of 5 stars and wrote "Macherla Niyojakavargam is sadly all style and no substance". Murali Krishna CH of The New Indian Express stated "Macherla Niyojakavargam is painfully predictable and ridiculously repetitive".

References

External links 
 
 Macherla Niyojakavargam on ZEE5

Indian action thriller films
2022 action thriller films
2022 films
2020s Telugu-language films
Indian action comedy films
2020s masala films
Films set in Andhra Pradesh
Films shot in Hyderabad, India